The High Authority was the executive branch of the former European Coal and Steel Community (ECSC). It was created in 1951 and disbanded in 1967 when it was merged into the European Commission.

History

The High Authority was at the core of the idea of the ECSC. It was to be an independent, supranational executive checked by a Common Assembly. There were concerns about this power, leading to a Council (of governments) and Parliament (of MPs) to be created to act as a counterweight. The inaugural sitting of the Authority was held in Luxembourg's city hall on 10 August 1952. Jean Monnet, the architect of the ECSC, was elected as its first President.

The supranational power exercised by the Authority did prompt suspicion by some, for example the government of France who ensured that in the European Economic Community (EEC) and European Atomic Energy Community (Euratom) more power would be in the hands of the council.

The Merger Treaty came into force in 1967; this combined the independent institutions of the ECSC and Euratom with those of the EEC. From that time the High Authority ceased to exist, its duties being taken on by the Commission of the European Communities. The administration of Rinaldo Del Bo ended before the merger so an interim President was appointed to oversee the merger, Albert Coppé. The Authority met for the last time on 28 June 1967.

Powers
The Authority's principal innovation was its supranational character. It had a broad area of competence to ensure the objectives of the treaty were met and that the common market functioned smoothly. The High Authority could issue three types of legal instruments: Decisions, which were entirely binding laws; Recommendations, which had binding aims but with methods left to member states; and Opinions, which had no legal force.

Composition
The body consisted of nine members, nearly all appointed from the member states. The larger states, France, Germany and Italy, appointed two members each with the three smaller states, Belgium, Luxembourg and the Netherlands appointing one member each. The ninth member was the President, who was appointed by the eight other members.

Despite being appointed by national governments, the members were not supposed to represent their national interest, but rather took an oath to defend the general interests of the Community as a whole. Their independence was aided by members being barred from having any occupation outside the Authority or having any business interests.

President

The President was elected by the other appointed members, rather than directly by member states (as is the case of the current Commission President). The first president was Jean Monnet.

Location

The headquarters of the High Authority were in Luxembourg city, the seat of most ECSC institutions. This was only intended as the provisional seat as no formal agreement was reached at the ECSC's conference in 1952.

Luxembourg had proposed it be the provisional seat (except for the Common Assembly which was to be in Strasbourg) until an agreement was reached. Future executives, the Commissions of the EEC and Euratom, would eventually be based in Brussels.

The High Authority first had its offices in hotels, initially the Hôtel des Forges in Chateau de Beggen and then the Hôtel Grand-Chef in Mondorf-les-Bains. In 1953 it moved to the former seat of Luxembourg Railways on Place de Metz in Luxembourg, a grand building that later hosted the European Investment Bank from 1968 to 1980 and, since 1987, headquarters offices of the Banque et Caisse d'Épargne de l'État.

See also
 European Commission
 European Coal and Steel Community
 Institutions of the European Union
 Location of European Union institutions
 History of the European Communities (1945-1957)
 History of the European Communities (1958-1972)
 European Union law

Notes

External links
 Documents of the High Authority of the European Coal and Steel Community are consultable at the Historical Archives of the EU in Florence.
 Members of the High Authority of the European Coal and Steel Community (ECSC), CVCE
 Organisation chart of the ECSC High Authority (June 1967), CVCE
 Administrative organisation of the High Authority, CVCE

 
European Commission